Table Rock was a village in Taney County, Missouri, United States. The population was 229 at the 2000 census. It was part of the Branson, Missouri Micropolitan Statistical Area. It was located just east of the Table Rock Lake dam on the White River. It was annexed by Branson in 2004.

Geography
The site is located just northeast of the Table Rock dam site on Missouri Route 165. The Pointe Royale Village and country club is just to the southeast.

Demographics

At the 2000 census, there were 229 people, 96 households and 69 families residing in the village. The racial make-up was 94.76% White, 0.44% African American, 0.87% Native American, and 3.93% from two or more races. Hispanic or Latino of any race were 4.80% of the population.

There were 96 households, of which 25.0% had children under the age of 18 living with them, 60.4% were married couples living together, 6.3% had a female householder with no husband present, and 28.1% were non-families. 20.8% of all households were made up of individuals, and 1.0% had someone living alone who was 65 years of age or older. The average household size was 2.39 and the average family size was 2.74.

18.3% of the population were under the age of 18, 7.0% from 18 to 24, 35.8% from 25 to 44, 26.6% from 45 to 64, and 12.2% who were 65 years of age or older. The median age was 41 years. For every 100 females, there were 89.3 males. For every 100 females age 18 and over, there were 94.8 males.

The median household income was $40,000 and the median family income was $55,417. Males had a median income of $31,250 and females $27,500. The per capita income was $20,846. About 2.9% of families and 5.7% of the population were below the poverty line, including 4.9% of those under the age of eighteen and 5.6% of those 65 or over.

References

Branson, Missouri micropolitan area
Former populated places in Taney County, Missouri
Former villages in Missouri
Populated places disestablished in 2004
Former populated places in Missouri